Stictosomus is a genus of beetles in the family Cerambycidae. It is monotypic, being represented by the single species Stictosomus semicostatus.

References

Prioninae